Piedicavallo is a comune (municipality) in the Province of Biella in the Italian region Piedmont, located about  northeast of Turin and about  northwest of Biella.

Piedicavallo borders the following municipalities: Andorno Micca, Bioglio, Callabiana, Campiglia Cervo, Gaby, Pettinengo, Rosazza, Sagliano Micca, Tavigliano, Valle Mosso, Valle San Nicolao.

Demographic evolution

Twin towns — sister cities
Piedicavallo is twinned with:

  Avrieux, France (2009)

References

Cities and towns in Piedmont